Liam Roche (born 14 September 1999) is a Zimbabwean cricketer. He made his first-class debut for Mashonaland Eagles in the 2017–18 Logan Cup on 21 November 2017. Four days prior to his debut, he was named as captain of Zimbabwe's squad for the 2018 Under-19 Cricket World Cup.

He made his List A debut for Mashonaland Eagles in the 2017–18 Pro50 Championship on 1 December 2017.

In June 2018, he was named in a Zimbabwe Select team for warm-up fixtures ahead of the 2018 Zimbabwe Tri-Nation Series. The following month, he was named in Zimbabwe's One Day International (ODI) squad for their series against Pakistan. He made his ODI debut for Zimbabwe against Pakistan on 13 July 2018.

References

External links
 

1999 births
Living people
Cricketers from Harare
Zimbabwean cricketers
Zimbabwe One Day International cricketers
Place of birth missing (living people)
Mashonaland Eagles cricketers